A shore is the fringe of land at the edge of a large body of water.

Shore may also refer to:

People
Adam Shore, American musician who was Warrant's original singer
Bernard Shore (1896–1985), English viola player and author.
David Shore (born 1959;), Canadian script writer and producer, best known for writing and directing the T.V. series House
Devin Shore (born 1994), Canadian ice hockey player
Dinah Shore (1916–1994), American actress and singer
Eddie Shore (1902–1985), Canadian professional ice hockey player 
Ernie Shore (1891–1980), American baseball player
Howard Shore (1946– ), Canadian composer, best known for composing the scores for The Lord of the Rings
Jane Shore (1445–1527), one of the many mistresses of King Edward IV of England
Jemima Shore, a fictional journalist featured in several crime novels by Antonia Fraser
John Shore (trumpeter) (1662–1752), an English trumpeter and the inventor of the tuning fork
John Shore, 1st Baron Teignmouth (1751–1834), British official in the East India Company
Mitzi Shore (née Saidel; 1930–2018), who owned The Comedy Store, mother of Pauly
Pauly Shore (1968– ), American actor and comedian
Peter Shore (1924–2001), a British Labour politician noted for his opposition to the European Community
Ryan Shore (1974– ), Canadian film composer and saxophonist
Sammy Shore (1927–2019), a comedian, who founded The Comedy Store, father of Pauly
Simon Shore (1959– ), British television and film director and writer
Stephen Shore (1947– ), American photographer known for his pioneering use of color in art photography
Viola Brothers Shore (1890–1970), American author

Arts, entertainment, and media
Shore (album), a 2020 album by Fleet Foxes
The Shore (band), an American rock group, or their 2004 album
The Shore (2011 film), a live-action short film
The Shore (1983 film), a Soviet-German romance film
"The Shore", a Ray Bradbury story published in The Martian Chronicles (October 2002/2033)
The Shore (video game), a 2021 Lovecraftian horror adventure video game.

Other uses
Shore durometer, the hardness of a material
Shoring, supporting a structure in order to prevent collapse so that construction can proceed
Sydney Church of England Grammar School, also known as the Shore School

See also

Shoreline (disambiguation)

Jersey Shore (disambiguation)
Schorr

Hebrew-language surnames
Jewish surnames
Germanic-language surnames